Misionella is a genus of South American crevice weavers that was first described by M. J. Ramírez & C. J. Grismado in 1997. In 2005 a spider fossil found in 15- to 20-million-year-old Miocene amber from the Dominican Republic was described as Misionella didicostae. A second specimen was discussed soon thereafter.

Species
 it contains five species from Brazil and Argentina:
Misionella aikewara Brescovit, Magalhaes & Cizauskas, 2016 – Brazil
Misionella carajas Brescovit, Magalhaes & Cizauskas, 2016 – Brazil
Misionella jaminawa Grismado & Ramírez, 2000 – Brazil
Misionella mendensis (Mello-Leitão, 1920) (type) – Brazil, Argentina
Misionella pallida Brescovit, Magalhaes & Cizauskas, 2016 – Brazil

References

Araneomorphae genera
Filistatidae
Spiders of Argentina
Spiders of Brazil